Presence may refer to:

Technology 
 Presence (sound recording), also known as room tone 
 Presence (amplification), used in four band equalisation
 Presence (telepresence), the scientific and technological field
 Immersion (virtual reality)#Presence in virtual reality environments
 Presence information, indicating availability of people on a telecommunications network
 Presence service, a network service which accepts, stores and distributes presence information
 Presence: Teleoperators & Virtual Environments, a bimonthly journal dedicated to electromechanical and computer systems
 Distributed presence, a digital marketing term
 Web presence, the appearance of a person or organization on the World Wide Web

Arts and entertainment 
 Presence (DC Comics), a fictional comic book representation of the Abrahamic God of Judeo-Christian-Islamic theology
 Presence (Marvel Comics), or Sergei Krylov, a fictional character in the Marvel Comics universe
 "Presence", an episode from the second season of NewsRadio, an American sitcom, originally broadcast from 1995 to 1999 on NBC
 Presence, a segment of the anthology anime film Robot Carnival
 The Presence: A Ghost Story, a children's ghost novel by Eve Bunting
The Presence, a novel by Paul Black
 The Presence (1989 film), an American horror film primarily known as Witchtrap
 The Presence (1992 film), an American made-for-television film primarily known as Danger Island
 The Presence (2010 film), an American horror film directed by Tom Provost
 Presence (play), a 2001 play written by David Harrower
 "Presence", a song by Brittany Howard from the album Jaime

Music 
 Presence (Led Zeppelin album), a 1976 album by Led Zeppelin
 Presence (Petit Biscuit album), a 2017 album by Petit Biscuit
 Presence (band), a short-lived British rock band started by Gary Biddles, Lol Tolhurst, and Michael Dempsey

Other uses 
 Divine presence, indicating a religious concept of God being "present" among people
 Metaphysics of presence, a philosophical concept
 Presencia de América Latina, a mural painted by Mexican artist Jorge González Camarena
 Real Presence, a term various Christian traditions use to express their belief that, in the Eucharist, Jesus Christ is really present

See also 
 Present (disambiguation)